The National Forum is a political party in Georgia established on December 15, 2006 by the former diplomat Kakha Shartava. He is the son of Zhiuli Shartava, a Georgian politician in Abkhazia, killed by the Abkhaz militias during the secessionist war in the region in 1993. Several veteran politicians such as Revaz Shavishvili, Irakli Melashvili and Gubaz Sanikidze also joined the party.  
Party political council of the organizational members are: Kakhaber Shartava, Gubaz Sanikidze, Revaz Shavishvili, Irakli Melashvili, Nodar Javakhishvili and Irakli Gobejishvili. A leading Party member was economic expert Niko Orvelashvili  who died on 15 January 2010.
The party advocates a parliamentary republic as a form of government in Georgia. Unlike most other Georgian political parties, it does not support Georgia’s aspiration to join NATO, and argues Georgia should be a "neutral country." The National Forum was a member of the United Opposition alliance which staged mass anti-government demonstrations in November 2007 and ran on an opposition ticket in the parliamentary election in May 2008. For the 2012 elections it was part of the Georgian Dream alliance that won the election against United National Movement. On April 3, 2016 National Forum left coalition after party convention, majority of members voted to leave Georgian Dream.
In 2017, Nation Forum, together with Davit Usupashvili and other former members of Republican Party of Georgia found Development Movement.

References

Political parties in Georgia (country)
Political parties established in 2006
2006 establishments in Georgia (country)
Decentralization